Dallıbel is a village in the Mazgirt District, Tunceli Province, Turkey. The village is populated by Kurds of the Hormek tribe and had a population of 66 in 2021.

The hamlets of Aralık, Çayırlı, Meşelik, Oruç, Uğurlu and Yarış are attached to the village.

References 

Villages in Mazgirt District
Kurdish settlements in Tunceli Province